The Star is a Thai reality television singing competition produced by Exact, a GMM Grammy company, and broadcast on Modernine TV. It was first broadcast on 7 October 2003 and its fifth season aired during the first half of 2009. It is one of two such television programmes in Thailand, the other being Academy Fantasia. Both feature a number of auditioned contestants competing in weekly concerts, with elimination determined by viewers' voting through SMS, but unlike the other, The Star does not feature continuous broadcasts of the contestants' lives in a common residence. A number of winners and runners-up from the contest have continued to become mainstream singers and/or actors under GMM Grammy, most notably Sukrit Wisetkaew ("Bie"), who was first runner-up in the show's third season.

Patterns and rules
The event begins with the recruitment of competitors from all over the country. The divisions are separated into four regions, albeit the Central (ภาคกลาง), the North (ภาคเหนือ), the Isan (ภาคตะวันออกเฉียงเหนือ), the East (ภาคตะวันออก), and the South (ภาคใต้). The revision and judgement is carried out by Phech Mar (เพชร มาร์), Sutheesak Pakdeetewa (สุธีศักดิ์ ภักดีเทวา) and Ornapha Krisadee (อรนภา กฤษฎี). The people selected will compete with other agencies to find the eight people to compete in the final.

The final 8 competitors will then have an opportunity to compete live on stage, which is hosted every weekend.  The scores are calculated from two places, one from the people in the concert, which represents 10% of the total score, while the other 90% comes from votes sent by audiences watching on live on TV (via SMS), in which both places may send as many as they can during the concert time. Once the singing from the competitors is complete, the host will count the votes and declare the competitor with the fewest votes. The latter then is eliminated, in season 2 to season 12, the eliminated competitor will sing one last song before ultimately leaving. The elimination process takes place once a week. The winner of the competition is given the chance to sign a contract and become an artist at GMM Grammy.

Since season 12 onwards, the recruitment ultimately changes to be recruits only in Bangkok. and "Online Audition" that must be sending their singing video. competitors who qualified from both formats will advanced to the preliminary round. The final preliminary round will compete live on stage, and later live announcements the final 8 competitors. Other that, The scores are now calculated from three places, one from the people in the concert, which represents 10% of the total score, one from the judges that have 10 points per person, total 30 points, which also represents 10% of total score. And the other 80% comes from votes sent by audiences watching on live on TV (via SMS).

In The Star Idol, the recruitment are similar to season 12, but don't have the walk-in auditions due to COVID-19 pandemic. Competitors who qualified from the first preliminary round are come to preform in front of the judges, and find out the twenty people to compete in the next competitions until the last twelve, and later the last eight competitors will be compete live in studio. The scores are changes again that calculated from three places, one from the judges, which represents 40% of the total score, one from the guest artist that maybe the other artists, or the previous contestants from the last 12 seasons. They represents 10% of total score. And the other 50% comes from votes sent by audiences watching on live on TV (via SMS, Application, and Websites).

In The Star 2022, the recruitment are similar to the first eleven seasons, and final eight competitors are back to compete live on stage. The scores are similar to season 12 that calculated from three places, one from the people in the concert, which represents 10% of the total score, one from the judges which represents 30% of total score. And the other 60% comes from votes sent by audiences watching on live on TV (via SMS, Application, and Websites). Except the final week, there is no studio score vote and commentator's score. All of 100% score votes are from audience.

The Presenters and Commentator

Presenters
Key:
 Current presenter of The Star
 Previous presenter of The Star

Commentator
Key:
 Current Commentator of The Star
 Previous Commentator of The Star

List of winners and runners up of The Star 

  Male
  Female

By city tally

Winner by Provinces

The Star Season 1 (2003)

Eliminated Chart

  Male
  Female

The Star Season 2 (2004)

Eliminated Chart

  Male
  Female

 * In the 2nd week, there were 4 invalid cards, made total votes were only 96 votes.

The Star Season 3 (2006)

Eliminated Chart

  Male
  Female

The Star Season 4 (2008)

Eliminated Chart

  Male
  Female

 * Max replaces Narm - Siranee Thongniyom, who withdrawn from the competition to recover from leukemia, and she later passed away on March 31st, 2008.

The Star Season 5 (2009)

Eliminated Chart

  Male
  Female

The Star Season 6 (2010)

Eliminated Chart

  Male
  Female

The Star Season 7 (2011)

Eliminated Chart

  Male
  Female

The Star Season 8 (2012)

Eliminated Chart

  Male
  Female

The Star Season 9 (2013)

Eliminated Chart

  Male
  Female

 * In the 3rd week, Thai Folk song. During Boon's show, there was a technical malfunction. That causes everyone in the studio can't hear Boon's voice throughout his show, but didn't effect to audience from TV. Later, the program announced that all contestants could continue to the next week without elimination. All vote scores will be added to the following week, which will have the 2 contestants with the fewest score eliminate.

The Star Season 10 (2014)

Eliminated Chart

  Male
  Female

The Star Season 11 (2015)

Eliminated Chart

  Male
  Female

The Star Season 12 (2016)

Eliminated Chart

  Male
  Female

The Star Idol (2021)

Eliminated Chart

  Male
  Female

The Star 2022 (2022)

Eliminated Chart

  Male
  Female

 In the 7th week, there were studio score vote and commentator's score. All of 100% score votes were from audience.

References

External links
 Official Website

MCOT HD original programming
One 31 original programming
Thai reality television series
2003 Thai television series debuts
 
2000s Thai television series
2010s Thai television series